Electro house is a genre of electronic dance music characterized by heavy bass and a tempo around 128 beats per minute. The term has been used to describe the music of many DJ Mag Top 100 DJs, including Benny Benassi, Skrillex, Steve Aoki, and Deadmau5.

Characteristics
Simon Reynolds described electro house, as a style attributed to artists like Zedd, Erol Alkan and Bloody Beetroots.
Electro-house is typified by its heavy bass. This is often in the form of buzzing basslines, such as those created with sawtooth waves and distortion. It is also often in the form of large bass drum sounds in a four-on-the-floor pattern. The tempo of electro house is usually between 125 and 135 beats per minute. Electro house sometimes resembles tech house, but it can contain melodic elements and electro-influenced samples and synths. In contrast, Reynolds stated the genre had "little relationship with either house or electro".

History
Reynolds described the sound as being influenced by Discovery by Daft Punk and further developed by Justice and Digitalism. The sound was popularized in the United States by deadmau5 and noted the style's distinct style had a "dirty bass" with "grinding and whirring sawtooth b-lines".

By 2011, the word "electro" had come to be seen as an adjective denoting "hard electronic dance music".

Early songs that have been labelled retroactively as electro house include "Dark Invader" (1996) by Arrivers and "Raw S*it" (1997) by Basement Jaxx. Mr. Oizo's "Flat Beat" (1999) has also been considered an early example of the genre.

Andy Kellman of AllMusic described "Satisfaction" (2002) by Italian DJ Benny Benassi as being a precursor to electro-house. By the mid 2000s, electro house saw an increase in popularity. In November 2006, electro house tracks "Put Your Hands Up For Detroit" by Fedde Le Grand and the D. Ramirez remix of "Yeah Yeah" by Bodyrox and Luciana held the number one and number two spots, respectively, in the UK Top 40 singles charts. Since then, electro house producers such as Feed Me, Knife Party, The M Machine, Porter Robinson, Yasutaka Nakata and Dada Life have emerged.

Subgenres

Big room

In the early 2010s, a type of electro house known as big room began to develop, particularly gaining popularity through EDM-oriented events and festivals. Big room songs resemble Dutch house, often incorporating drops, minimalist percussion, regular beats, sub-bass layered kicks, simple melodies and synth-driven breakdowns. The layout of a big room track is very similar to the layout of a typical electro house song.

Complextro

Complextro is typified by glitchy, intricate basslines and textures created by sharply cutting between instruments in quick succession. The term, a portmanteau of the words "complex" and "electro", was coined by Porter Robinson to describe the music he was making in 2010. He has cited video game sounds, or chiptunes, as an influence on his music along with 1980s analog synth music. Other producers of the genre include Adventure Club, Kill The Noise, Knife Party, The M Machine, Madeon, Mord Fustang, Savant, Virtual Riot, Deadmau5 and Wolfgang Gartner.

Dutch house

Dutch house, sometimes referred to as 'Dirty Dutch', is a style of electro house that originated in the Netherlands and found prominence by 2009, mainly pioneered by Vato Gonzalez , Afrojack and DJ Chuckie. It is primarily defined by complex rhythms made from Latin-influenced drum kits, a lower emphasis on basslines and squeaky, high-pitched lead synths. Influences on the subgenre include Detroit techno, hip hop and other urban styles of music.

Fidget house

Fidget house, or fidget, is "defined by snatched vocal snippets, pitch-bent dirty basslines and rave-style synth stabs over glitchy 4/4 beats." It contains influences from Chicago house, Detroit techno, Baltimore club, Kuduro, Pimba and hip hop. Purveyors of the genre include The Bloody Beetroots, AC Slater, Danger, Hervé, Jack Beats and Switch. The term fidget house was coined by DJs/producers Jesse Rose and Switch, "as a joke, which has now gone a little too far."

Melbourne bounce

Melbourne bounce is a subgenre of electro house originating in Melbourne, Australia, characterized by the progression from the uptempo, horn-infused Dutch house style, tech trance synths, electro house stabs, and scouse house-influenced bass lines, sometimes also including elements of acid house, psytrance. The genre is generally characterized by a standard 128 bpm, although in some cases up to 150 bpm. The term has been used to describe the 2012 to 2016 music of some DJ/producers, including Deorro, Joel Fletcher, Will Sparks, Vinai, and TJR. It is composed of bouncy offbeat bass, whiny vocal cut/saw lead, raucous horns, 8-bar snare fills before the drop. It often features a repetitive beat structure with some amount of build-ups and mild drops throughout. It started as a cross between elements, and underground Melbourne house/minimal style. Melbourne Bounce gained popularity around mid to late 2012 and had a steady rise from 2013. In 2014, productions of Joel Fletcher, Will Sparks, and Uberjak'd were playing both domestically and internationally, and influencing the EDM style of Steve Aoki, TJR, and more.

Further development

Jungle terror
Jungle terror is a music genre that developed in the 2010s. It is often described as a "chaotic" mix of house with grime and drum 'n' bass rhythms. There are also animal noises as well as vocal cuts and percussions. The Dutch DJ and music producer Wiwek is named as the founder of the genre, who made the style popular in the EDM scene between 2013 and 2016. Skrillex, Diplo and KURA are also associated with the genre.

Moombahton

Moombahton came as a mixture of slowed-down Dutch house and reggaeton. Its identifying characteristics include "a thick, spread-out bass line; some dramatic builds; and a two-step pulse, with quick drum fills", but it has "no real rules beyond working within a 108 bpm range." A portmanteau of "moombah" and "reggaeton", moombahton was created by DJ Dave Nada when he slowed down the tempo of the Afrojack remix of the Silvio Ecomo & Chuckie song "Moombah" to please party-goers with tastes in reggaeton. Other producers of the genre include Dillon Francis, Diplo and Munchi.

Moombahcore is a style of moombahton with elements of breakcore, dubstep, techstep and newstyle hardcore. Characteristics of the genre include chopped vocals, dubstep-influenced bass sounds and extensive build-ups. Artists who have produced moombahcore include Delta Heavy, Dillon Francis, Feed Me, Knife Party, and Noisia.

See also 
 List of electro house artists
 List of electronic music genres
 List of electronic dance music genres

Notes and references 

 
1990s in music
2000s in music
2010s in music
House music genres